Tornado potatoes, also called twist potatoes or tornado fries, are a popular street food in South Korea, originally developed by Jeong Eun Suk of Agricultural Hoeori Inc. It is a deep fried spiral-cut whole potato on a skewer, similar to a French fry, brushed with various seasonings such as onion, cheese, or honey. Some varieties have spliced sausages in between.

Gallery

See also 
 French fries
 Potato chip

References 

Potato dishes
Deep fried foods
Korean snack food
Street food in South Korea
Skewered foods